WIVK-FM (107.7 MHz) is a commercial FM radio station in Knoxville, Tennessee. The station is owned by Cumulus Media and broadcasts a country music radio format known as "WIVK {wih-vik} The Frog Station."  The studios and offices are on Old Kingston Pike in the Sequoyah Hills section of West Knoxville.  On weekends, it carries the nationally syndicated American Country Countdown with Kix Brooks, along with University of Tennessee Volunteers football games in the fall.

WIVK is a Class C FM station with an effective radiated power (ERP) of 91,000 watts, using HD Radio technology.  The transmitter is atop Greentop Knob on Chilhowee Mountain near Pigeon Forge.  The signal can be received around East Tennessee and parts of Southwest Virginia, Western North Carolina, Southeastern Kentucky, Northern Georgia and Northwest South Carolina.

History
It was a simulcast of the country format on co-owned WIVK 850 AM. Because the AM station is a daytimer, its format could continue on 107.7 FM after sunset. For several decades, the two stations aired a morning show hosted by Claude "The Cat" Tomlinson. He also served as the program director and promotions director.

The simulcast briefly ended when the AM station switched to a full service, adult contemporary format, becoming WHIG. Many listeners were not happy, so the adult contemporary format on WHIG was short-lived. The WIVK simulcast on 107.7 FM and 850 AM returned.  On September 1, 1988, WIVK 850 AM signal was donated to the University of Tennessee and became a news/talk station as WUTK.  WIVK moved its AM simulcast to another station at 990 kHz on the same day and the simulcast continued.

For most of the 1980s and 1990s, WIVK-AM-FM were owned by Dick Broadcasting, with James A. Dick as the chairman.  The stations were acquired by Citadel Broadcasting in the early 2000s.  In 2011, Citadel was merged into Cumulus Media.

The AM 990/FM 107.7 simulcast lasted almost nine years.  In 1997, AM 990 switched to a talk format as "NewsTalk 990 WNOX" and later "NewsTalk 99". Today AM 990 is "The Sports Animal" which covers University of Tennessee athletics as well as national pro and college sports.

WIVK-FM is consistently one of the Knoxville radio market's top stations, usually ranked #1 or #2 in the Nielsen ratings.  It has received numerous Country Music Association, Academy of Country Music, Associated Press, NAB Marconi and RTNDA Edward R. Murrow Awards.

References

Further reading
 Ed Hooper (2008), Knoxville's WIVK, Arcadia Publishing. ,

External links
WIVK website

Country radio stations in the United States
IVK-FM
Cumulus Media radio stations
1965 establishments in Tennessee
Radio stations established in 1965